The Train of Pain – Memorial to Victims of Stalinist Repression is a monument in Chișinău, Moldova. A temporary stone was unveiled in 1990 in Central Station Square commemorating the 1940–1951 mass deportations in Soviet Moldavia. A permanent memorial was completed at the site in 2013. The sculptural element was assembled in Belarus.

Temporary memorial

See also 
 Monument to the Victims of the Soviet Occupation
 Soviet Occupation Day, Moldova

References

External links 

 Victimele represiunilor regimului comunist-stalinist au participat la mitingul prilejuit de implinirea a 56 de ani de la deportarile comuniste din 6 iulie 1949
 Premierul Filat a depus flori la piatra de temelie a Monumentului victimelor represiunilor staliniste din scuarul Gării

Monuments and memorials in Chișinău
2013 in Moldova
2013 sculptures
Memorials to victims of communism
Anti-communism in Moldova
Political repression